The Fort Payne Residential Historic District is a historic district in Fort Payne, Alabama.  The district represents both of Fort Payne's major periods of growth: the 1880s and 1890s, fueled by the area's mineral deposits; and the 1910s through the 1930s, bolstered by the development of the hosiery industry.  The area was predominantly middle class, meaning only a few Queen Anne homes were built; most houses from the early period were built in more restrained Vernacular Victorian styles.  Later construction is dominated by American Foursquares and Craftsman Bungalows.  The district was listed on the National Register of Historic Places in 1988.

References

National Register of Historic Places in DeKalb County, Alabama
Historic districts in DeKalb County, Alabama
Historic districts on the National Register of Historic Places in Alabama